Wired to the Moon is the sixth studio album by British singer-songwriter Chris Rea, released in 1984. The album reached No. 35 on the UK album charts. Three singles were released. "I Don't Know What It Is But I Love It" peaked at No. 65 on the UK Singles Chart, "Touché d'Amour" reached No. 86, and "Ace of Hearts" peaked at No. 79. The latter was re-released in 1985 and climbed one position higher, to No. 78.

Track listing
All songs by Chris Rea
 "Bombollini" 6:11
 "Touché d'Amour" 3:30
 "Shine, Shine, Shine" 4:04
 "Mystery Man" 3:22  (this track is only on the German LP)
 "Wired to the Moon" 5:20
 "Reasons" 3:47
 "I Don't Know What It Is But I Love It" 3:35  (Cassette version includes the extended version 5:25)
 "Ace of Hearts" 4:29
 "Holding Out" 4:26
 "Winning" 6:33

Personnel 
 Chris Rea – vocals (1, 3-9), keyboards (1-9), acoustic piano (1, 9), lead guitar (1-5, 8, 9), guitars (1, 2, 3, 5-9), bass guitar (1, 3, 5, 6, 9), marimba (1), accordion (2), fretless bass (7)
 David Richards – synthesizers (5, 6)
 Jerry Stevenson – guitars (2, 6, 7), acoustic guitars (7)
 Kevin Powell – bass guitar (2, 5, 7, 8)
 Jeff Seopardie – drums (1-9), percussion (1, 2, 3), brushes (7)

Production 
 Chris Rea – producer 
 David Richards – producer, engineer 
 John Dent – mastering 
 Jo Mirowski –  art direction, design
 Paul Lilly – management

Singles
 "I Don't Know What It Is (But I Love It)" b/w "Mystery Man"
 "Touché d'amour (Remix)" b/w "Touché d'amour (Instrumental)"
 "Bombollini (Edit)" b/w "True Love"
 "Ace of Hearts (Remix)" b/w "I Can Hear Your Heartbeat (Live)", "True Love", "From Love to Love", "Smile"
 "Wired to the Moon" b/w "True Love"

References

1984 albums
Chris Rea albums
Albums produced by David Richards (record producer)
Magnet Records albums